The Mexican Special Forces Corps are the special forces battalions of the Mexican Army. Formerly the Special Forces Airmobile Group or GAFE, the SF corps has six regular battalions; plus four specialized units, one of those units is the Fuerza Especial de Reaccion, the other three remain secretive for the public; the motto of the SF Corps is Todo por México (Everything for Mexico).

Within the SF Corps, there are regular, intermediate, and veteran -service troops. The regular-service soldiers usually operate as light infantry. The intermediate and veteran-service soldiers (officers and sergeants) usually are instructors known as COFE or CSFE. Most of the veteran-service soldiers of the Fuerzas Especiales del Alto Mando (FEs High Command) handle Black-Ops missions.

History

GAFE was created in 1986 as the "Fuerza de Intervención Rápida" (Rapid Intervention Force) to provide security for the FIFA World Cup soccer games in Mexico City. France's GIGN trained the group in special weapons and counter-terrorism tactics. On 1 June 1990 the group adopted its most known name, GAFE, becoming a Corps (with division-sized formation) in 2013 as part of the expansion of the Army. It again changed its name from GAFE to Special Forces Corps in 2004.

Eight years later (in 1994) the GAFEs saw action fighting EZLN guerrillas in Chiapas. There is scant public information about the operations in which they participated during that conflict.  During the 1990s, the GAFE reportedly received training in commando and urban warfare from Israeli special forces and American Special Forces units, which included training in rapid deployment, marksmanship, ambushes, counter-surveillance and the art of intimidation. It is also known that at some point several members were trained in the infamous US Army School of the Americas, in enhanced interrogation techniques and psychological warfare (Psy-Ops).

Nowadays the army special forces continue fighting the war against drug cartels in Mexico. They have successfully captured many big drug leaders such as Benjamin Arellano Felix of the Tijuana Cartel, Carlos Rosales Mendoza of La Familia Cartel and Osiel Cardenas Guillen of the Gulf Cartel.

Controversies

In 1994 the EZLN guerrilla seized several towns across the southern state of Chiapas. The Mexican government sent in "GAFEs" to put down the insurgents. Within hours, 30 rebels were killed and others were captured. Later their bodies were disposed on a riverbank – with their ears and noses sliced off.

In 1999, about 34 GAFE defectors were recruited to join the Gulf Cartel, serving as the cartel's armed wing - which became known as Los Zetas. This group also recruited national and foreign military personnel (like U.S. Army soldiers and Guatemalan Kaibiles), corrupt police officers and street gang members, and used their knowledge of torture and psychological warfare to terrorize their rivals and innocent civilians alike. By 2011 only 10 of the original 34 zetas remained fugitives. Most of them have been killed or captured by Mexican Army, Federal Police and the Special Forces Corps.

It is alleged that on 2 October 2013 during a demonstration by so-called "anarchist youth groups" to protest against the Mexican President and to commemorate the 1968 tlatelolco student massacre, undercover GAFEs worked as agent provocateurs to disrupt the march and cause the riot police to crush it.

Training
Since its creation they have received a wide variety of training from different special forces groups from around the world (including the French GIGN, Israeli Sayeret and American Green Berets). The Army unified all the knowledge by creating in 1998 the Escuela Militar de Fuerzas Especiales (En. Special Forces Military School). This became the "Centro de Adiestramiento de Fuerzas Especiales" (Special Forces Training Center), located in the foothills of the Iztaccíhuatl volcano, on 1 May 2002. The basic special forces course lasts 6 months.

Special Forces Instructors' Officers Course (Curso de Oficiales Instructores de las Fuerzas Especiales – COIFE)
Ranks Officers Training of Special Forces (CACFE)
Specialized Training for Special Forces Instructors and Officers (Curso Avanzado de Instructores de Fuerzas Especiales – CAIFE)

Training scenarios
Jungle/Amphibious/Combat Diving: Jungle and Amphibious Operations Training Center, Xtomoc, Quintana Roo. Training also takes place in different scenarios in the state of Guerrero.
Urban/Intervention: San Miguel de los Jagueyes, La Casa de la Muerte in Puebla and Temamatla, Estado de México.
Mountain: El Salto, Durango, and Guerrero.
Desert Operations Training Center: Laguna Salada and Baja California 
Airmobile/Airborne: Air Force base of Santa Lucía, Estado de México and Guerrero.
High mountain:  Nevado de Toluca, Iztaccíhuatl and Pico de Orizaba volcanoes.

Organization 
The CFE proper, reporting to the SEDENA in Mexico City, is headquartered in Temamatla, Mexico and is divided into:

 1st SF Battalion
 2nd SF Battalion 
 3rd SF Battalion 
 4th SF Battalion 
 5th SF Battalion 
 6th SF Battalion (Sonora, México) 
Four secretive specialized units:

 Special Reaction Force 
 Unknown 
 Unknown 
 Unknown

Transportation
UH-60 Black Hawk, Mil Mi-17, CH-53 Yas'ur 2000, MD 530F, Bell 212 and Bell 412 helicopters.
Fast Attack Vehicle/Light Strike Vehicle, Humvee, customized Dodge Ram pickup trucks, all-terrain vehicles, Plasan Sand Cat, off-road motorcycles and inflatable/fast boats.

Weaponry

Pistols
 Heckler & Koch P7M13
 Beretta 92F
 M1911 pistol
 Glock 17
 SIG Sauer P320

Short-barreled
 Heckler & Koch MP5
 FN P90

Rifles
 FX-05 Xiuhcoatl
 M4 Carbine
 Heckler & Koch G3
 SIG Sauer SIG516
 FN SCAR

Precision Rifles
 Heckler & Koch PSG1
 M24 Sniper Weapon System
 Remington 700
 Sniper Rifle Morelos
 AX308

Anti-materiel / Hard targets
 Barrett M82 (.50 BMG)

Shotguns 
 Remington 1100
 Mossberg 500

Machine guns
 FN MAG
 Heckler & Koch HK21E
 M249 light machine gun

Grenade launchers
 M203 grenade launcher
 Milkor MGL Mk 1

Anti-Tank 
 B-300
 RPG-7
 RPG-29
 RL-83 Blindicide

Other
 CornerShot

See also
Grupo Aeromóvil de Fuerzas Especiales del Alto Mando
Fuerzas Especiales
Brigada de Fusileros Paracaidistas
Mexican Special Forces
Grupo de Operaciones Especiales (Mexico)
Los Zetas

References 

Special forces of Mexico
Military units and formations established in 1986